"Man on Your Mind" is a song by Australian rock band Little River Band. It was released in December 1981 as the second single from their sixth studio album, Time Exposure. "Man on Your Mind" peaked at No. 14 on the US Billboard Hot 100.

Track listings
 Australian 7" (Capitol Records – CP-633)
A. "Man on Your Mind" - 4:05
B. "Love Will Survive" - 4:38

 New Zealand 7" (Capitol Records – F 5061)
A. "Man on Your Mind" - 4:05
B. "Orbit Zero" - 4:28	

 North American 7" (Capitol Records – B-5061)
A. "Man on Your Mind" - 4:05
B. "Orbit Zero" - 4:28

Charts

Weekly charts

Year-end charts

References

External links
 

1981 singles
Little River Band songs
Capitol Records singles
EMI Records singles
Songs written by Glenn Shorrock
1981 songs
Song recordings produced by George Martin
Songs written by Kerryn Tolhurst